Rochester University (formerly Rochester College) is a private Christian college in Rochester Hills, Michigan. It was founded by members of the Churches of Christ in 1959.

Rochester University is primarily undergraduate (though it offers some graduate programs, such as a Master of Religious Education program) and includes both residential and commuting student populations. It also offers a degree completion program for adult students.

History
In 1954, members of the Churches of Christ formed a board of trustees to establish an educational institution in the North Central region of the United States. After months of consideration, the board decided to establish a liberal arts college and purchased a country estate in Rochester Hills, Michigan, for a campus site. In September 1959, the college opened as North Central Christian College, retaining that name until 1961.

In the years that followed, the institution operated under the name of Michigan Christian College. In 1997, the board adopted the name Rochester College to more clearly portray the institution's nature as a liberal arts college in a Christian setting. The campus of Rochester University has grown to exceed , assuring space for continued expansion. In 2019 the name was changed to Rochester University.

Academics
Rochester's most popular majors, by 2021 graduates, were:
Early Childhood Education and Teaching (67)
Mass Communication/Media Studies (23)
Psychology (23)
Business Administration and Management (18)
Organizational Leadership (18)

Athletics
The Rochester athletic teams are called the Warriors. The university is a member of the National Association of Intercollegiate Athletics (NAIA), primarily competing in the Wolverine–Hoosier Athletic Conference (WHAC) since the 2017–18 academic year; although they had competed as an associate member for baseball during the 2016–17 school year prior to apply for full membership. The Warriors previously competed as an NAIA Independent within the Association of Independent Institutions (AII) from 2011–12 to 2016–17. Its men's wrestling team competed in the Sooner Athletic Conference (SAC) from 2018–19 to 2019–20.

Prior to joining the NAIA, they were also a member of the United States Collegiate Athletic Association (USCAA) and the National Small College Athletic Association (NSCAA) prior to that, in which the college won a combined eight national championships.

Rochester competes in 23 intercollegiate varsity sports: Men's sports include, baseball, basketball, bowling, cross country, golf, ice hockey, soccer, track & field (indoor and outdoor) and wrestling; while women's sports include basketball, bowling, cross country, golf, lacrosse, soccer, softball, track & field (indoor and outdoor) and volleyball; and co-ed sports include competitive cheer and esports.

Championships

References

External links
 
 Official athletics website

 
Universities and colleges affiliated with the Churches of Christ
Educational institutions established in 1959
Universities and colleges in Oakland County, Michigan
USCAA member institutions
Private universities and colleges in Michigan
1959 establishments in Michigan